Judith Tshabalala (born 30 March 1982) is a South African politician from Gauteng who has been Deputy Minister of Water and Sanitation since March 2023.

Tshabalala has served as a Member of the National Assembly of South Africa since 2019, and previously from 2011 to 2014. She is a member of the African National Congress.

Parliamentary career
Tshabalala is a member of the African National Congress. She entered the National Assembly of South Africa on 19 October 2011 as a replacement for Noluthando Mayende-Sibiya. During her first term, she was assigned to both the Standing Committee on Finance and the Portfolio Committee on Arts and Culture. In July 2013, she became a member of the ad hoc committee on the Appointment of the Auditor General. She was not elected to a full term in the 2014 general election, as she was ranked low on the ANC's regional-to-national list.

In May 2019, Tshabalala was elected to return to the National Assembly. From June 2019, she was a member of the Portfolio Committee on Public Enterprises.

National government
In a cabinet reshuffle on 6 March 2023, Tshabalala was appointed Deputy Minister of Water and Sanitation by president Cyril Ramaphosa. She replaced Dikeledi Magadzi who was dismissed from government.

Personal life
In February 2020, Tshabalala was hijacked at her home in Sebokeng. She was then taken hostage and dropped off unharmed in Eden Park, Alberton.

References

External links
Ms Judith Tshabalala at Parliament of South Africa

Living people
1982 births
People from Gauteng
Members of the National Assembly of South Africa
Women members of the National Assembly of South Africa
African National Congress politicians
21st-century South African politicians